In music, tension is the anticipation music creates in a listener's mind for relaxation or release. For example, tension may be produced through reiteration, increase in dynamic level, gradual motion to a higher or lower pitch, or (partial) syncopations between consonance and dissonance.

Experiments in music perception have explored perceived tension in music  and perceived emotional intensity.

The balance between tension and repose are explored in musical analysis—determined by contrasts that are, "...of great interest to the style analyst," and can be analyzed in several, even conflicting layers—as different musical elements such as harmony may create different levels of tension than rhythm and melody.

See also
 Conclusion (music)
 Musical argument
 Variation (music)

References

Music theory
Musical analysis